Baphia heudelotiana is a species of plant in the family Fabaceae.

It is found in Guinea and Senegal.

References

heudelotiana
Flora of Senegal
Flora of Guinea
Vulnerable plants
Taxa named by Henri Ernest Baillon
Taxonomy articles created by Polbot